A dry state was a state in the United States in which the manufacture, distribution, importation, and sale of alcoholic beverages was prohibited or tightly restricted. Some states, such as North Dakota, entered the United States as dry states, and others went dry after the passage of prohibition legislation, the Volstead Act. No state remains completely dry, but some states do contain dry counties.

Prior to the adoption of nationwide prohibition in 1920, state legislatures passed local option laws that allowed a county or township to go dry if it chose to do so. The Maine law, passed in 1851 in Maine, was among the first statutory implementations of the developing temperance movement in the United States.

Following Maine's lead, prohibition laws were soon passed in the states of Delaware, Ohio, Illinois, Rhode Island, Minnesota, Massachusetts, Connecticut, Pennsylvania and New York; however, all but one were repealed. The debate over prohibition increased in the United States during the late nineteenth and early twentieth century as the drys, including the Woman's Christian Temperance Union (WCTU), the National Prohibition Party, the Anti-Saloon League, and others, continued to support temperance and prohibition legislation, while the wets opposed it. By 1913 nine states had statewide prohibition and 31 others had local option laws, placing more than 50 percent of the United States population under some form of alcohol prohibition.

Following two unsuccessful attempts at national prohibition legislation (one in 1913 and the other in 1915), Congress approved a resolution on December 19, 1917, to prohibit the manufacture, sale, transportation, and importation of alcoholic beverages in the United States. The resolution was sent to the states for ratification and became the Eighteenth Amendment to the U.S. Constitution. On January 8, 1918, Mississippi became the first state to ratify the amendment and on January 16, 1919, Nebraska became the 36th state to do so, securing its passage with the required three-fourths of the states.  By the end of February 1919, only three states remained as hold-outs to ratification: New Jersey, Connecticut and Rhode Island.

The National Prohibition Act, also known as the Volstead Act, was enacted on October 18, 1919. Prohibition in the United States went into effect on January 17, 1920. Nationwide prohibition was repealed in 1933 with the passage of the Twenty-first Amendment on February 20 and its ratification on December 5.

List of formerly dry states 

This table lists the effective dates each state went dry and any dates of repeal that do not coincide with the end of national prohibition in 1933.

See also
 Dry county
 Alcoholic beverage control state
 List of alcohol laws of the United States by state

Notes 

Alcohol law in the United States
Prohibition in the United States